Wernhout is a village the south of the Netherlands. It is located in  Zundert, North Brabant, near the border with Belgium.

References

Populated places in North Brabant
Zundert